The Shur River is a river in southern Iran that flows into the Gulf of Oman in Hormozgan.
The river flows through the arid Lut desert. In 2005 NASA's Aqua satellite recorded surface temperature in the area at 70.7 °C. The salinity of the river derives from the salt rock in the hills near the headwaters and further  reduces  the level of plant life along the river.
The River has been dammed by international mining interests looking to extract the rich mineral deposits in the area.

References

Rivers of Hormozgan Province
Gulf of Oman